In mathematical optimization, a quadratically constrained quadratic program (QCQP) is an optimization problem in which both the objective function and the constraints are quadratic functions. It has the form

where P0, …, Pm are n-by-n matrices and x ∈ Rn is the optimization variable.

If P0, …, Pm are all positive semidefinite, then the problem is convex. If these matrices are neither positive nor negative semidefinite, the problem is non-convex. If P1, … ,Pm are all zero, then the constraints are in fact linear and the problem is a quadratic program.

Hardness 
Solving the general case is an NP-hard problem. To see this, note that the two constraints x1(x1 − 1) ≤ 0 and x1(x1 − 1) ≥ 0 are equivalent to the constraint x1(x1 − 1) = 0, which is in turn equivalent to the constraint x1 ∈ {0, 1}. Hence, any 0–1 integer program (in which all variables have to be either 0 or 1) can be formulated as a quadratically constrained quadratic program. Since 0–1 integer programming is NP-hard in general, QCQP is also NP-hard.

Relaxation 
There are two main relaxations of QCQP: using semidefinite programming (SDP), and using the reformulation-linearization technique (RLT). For some classes of QCQP problems (precisely, QCQPs with zero diagonal elements in the data matrices), second-order cone programming (SOCP) and linear programming (LP) relaxations providing the same objective value as the SDP relaxation are available.

Nonconvex QCQPs with non-positive off-diagonal elements can be exactly solved by the SDP or SOCP relaxations, and there are polynomial-time-checkable sufficient conditions for SDP relaxations of general QCQPs to be exact. Moreover, it was shown that a class of random general QCQPs has exact semidefinite relaxations with high probability as long as the number of constraints grows no faster than a fixed polynomial in the number of variables.

Semidefinite programming 
When P0, …, Pm are all positive-definite matrices, the problem is convex and can be readily solved using interior point methods, as done with semidefinite programming.

Example 
Max Cut is a problem in graph theory, which is NP-hard. Given a graph, the problem is to divide the vertices in two sets, so that as many edges as possible go from one set to the other. Max Cut can be formulated as a QCQP, and SDP relaxation of the dual provides good lower bounds.

Solvers and scripting (programming) languages

References

Further reading

In statistics

External links
 NEOS Optimization Guide: Quadratic Constrained Quadratic Programming

Mathematical optimization